New Social Democracy (in French: Nouvelle Démocratie Sociale, NDS) is a political party in Burkina Faso.

Its secretary general is Mamadou Samba Barry.

The NDS first took part in the parliamentary elections in 1992, following a growing movement towards a multi-party system in Burkina Faso. At the legislative elections in 1997 it won 2,885 votes. This number fell to 197 votes at the 2007 elections. The most recent elections, in 2015, saw the NDS win 165 votes. 
The party has, to date, yet to gain a seat in the National Assembly of Burkina Faso.

References

Political parties in Burkina Faso